Enrique Martinez or Enrique Martínez may refer to:

Enrique Martínez (equestrian) (1930–2021), Spanish equestrian
Enrique Martínez (politician) (1887–1938), Argentine politician
Enrique Martínez y Martínez (born 1948), Mexican politician
Enrique Martínez Heredia (born 1953), Spanish road bicycle racer
Enrique González Martínez (1871–1952), Mexican poet and diplomat
 Enrique García Martínez, a.k.a. Kike, Spanish footballer